Entelopes shelfordi is a species of beetle in the family Cerambycidae. It was named by Per Olof Christopher Aurivillius in 1923 based on a description and illustration by Robert Walter Campbell Shelford in 1902. It is known from Borneo.

Shelford wrote that this species mimicked the species Metrioidea apicalis in the family Galerucidae.

References

Further reading
 

Saperdini
Beetles described in 1923